VerticalResponse, Inc. is an American company providing software for sending email marketing, online surveys and direct mail for direct marketing campaigns. VerticalResponse's market research has been quoted by multiple media outlets, including The Miami Herald, Associated Press, Bloomberg Businessweek and Forbes.

History 

Janine Popick launched Vertical Response in 2001 after spearheading direct and Internet marketing programs for brands including NBC Internet; XOOM.com; Claris Corp., a wholly owned subsidiary of Apple Inc.; and Symantec Corporation. The company secured $1.4 million from 18 angel investors in its first four years of existence. It turned its first profit in 2005.

In late 2011, VerticalResponse acquired privately held Roost, a social media marketing technology company which provides an online tool for managing social networking marketing campaigns.

In 2013, VerticalResponse was acquired by Deluxe Corporation.

Awards 
 About.com 2012 Reader's Choice Award Winner: Best Email Marketing Service
 Ranked #66 on the 2011 San Francisco Business Times Fast 100 List of Fastest-Growing Private Companies
 Ranked #343 Fastest Growing Company in North America on Deloitte's 2011 Technology Fast 500
 2011 U.S. Chamber of Commerce Small Business Blue Ribbon Award
 2010 San Francisco Chamber of Commerce "Ebbies" Award for Emerging Growth

See also 
 Email marketing
 Social Media Marketing

External links 
 Official Company Website
 VR Marketing Blog

References 

Privately held companies based in California
Companies established in 2001
Companies based in San Francisco
Email marketing software